Chorley, Alderley is a civil parish in Cheshire East, England.  It contains three buildings that are recorded in the National Heritage List for England as designated listed buildings, all of which are at Grade II.  This grade is the lowest of the three gradings given to listed buildings and is applied to "buildings of national importance and special interest".  The parish is partly residential, but mainly rural.  The listed buildings consist of former farmhouses and associated structures.

See also
Listed buildings in Alderley Edge
Listed buildings in Nether Alderley
Listed buildings in Great Warford
Listed buildings in Mobberley
Listed buildings in Wilmslow

References

Listed buildings in the Borough of Cheshire East
Lists of listed buildings in Cheshire